Streptomyces pharmamarensis is a Gram-positive bacterium species from the genus of Streptomyces which has been isolated from marine sediment at the Mediterranean Sea near the Italian island of Sicily.

See also 
 List of Streptomyces species

References

Further reading

External links
Type strain of Streptomyces pharmamarensis at BacDive -  the Bacterial Diversity Metadatabase	

pharmamarensis
Bacteria described in 2012